The 12th Parliament of Antigua and Barbuda was formed on 23 March 2004.

It was the first parliament with a UPP majority.

Members

Senate

House of Representatives 

† = died in office

References 

Parliaments of Antigua and Barbuda